The Langeh are clan of Rajputs in India, found mainly in the Jammu region of Jammu and Kashmir and parts of Himachal Pradesh.

See also 
Dogra

"Langeh" is also written as "Langhe"

References 

Dogra
Social groups of Jammu and Kashmir
Social groups of Himachal Pradesh